The Girl Who Fell from the Sky (as published in the UK by Little, Brown and Company) or Trapeze (as published in the US by Other Press) is a novel written by Simon Mawer, published in 2012.  It is a historical novel about a woman during World War II whose ability to speak French and propensity for risk  attracts the attention of the Special Operations Executive and eventually leads her to be an agent operating in occupied Europe before she is even twenty years old. Mawer incorporates both fact and fiction in the telling of her story. The American title was chosen to avoid confusion with the 2010 novel by Heidi W. Durrow.

The book has been widely reviewed in a number of news sources in the UK (including The Guardian, The Independent and The Telegraph)  and USA (including the Washington Post).

In June 2012, Mawer was the guest on a radio broadcast of the Diane Rehm Show, where he talked about his new book.

References

External links
 Other Press webpage on Trapeze
 Mawer's webpage Trapeze

2012 British novels
Novels set during World War II
Little, Brown and Company books
Other Press books